This is an incomplete list of works, by Tivadar Csontváry Kosztka.

Notes

Lists of works of art